What Price Love? is a 1929 German silent film directed by E. W. Emo and starring Igo Sym.

Cast
In alphabetical order
 as Celestine
Max Freiburg as a servant
Mizzi Griebl
Leopold Kramer as banker Leblanc
Hans Melzer as doctor
H. M. Reinhardt as detective
Von Stolberg as Latin
Igo Sym as Lucien
Hilde von Stolz

References

External links

Films of the Weimar Republic
Films directed by E. W. Emo
German silent feature films
German black-and-white films